The 1965 Arizona State Sun Devils baseball team represented Arizona State University in the 1965 NCAA University Division baseball season. The team was coached by Bobby Winkles in his 7th season at Arizona State.

The Sun Devils won the College World Series, defeating the Ohio State Buckeyes in the championship game.

Roster

Schedule 

! style="background:#FCC626;color:#990033;"| Regular Season
|- valign="top" 

|- align="center" bgcolor="#ddffdd"
| February 26 ||  || 7–5 || 1–0 || –
|- align="center" bgcolor="#ddffdd"
| February 27 || San Fernando State || 11–7 || 2–0 || –
|- align="center" bgcolor="#ddffdd"
| February 27 || San Fernando State || 10–5 || 3–0 || –
|- align="center" bgcolor="#ffdddd"
| March 5 ||  || 3–6 || 3–1 || –
|- align="center" bgcolor="#ddffdd"
| March 6 || Michigan || 5–2 || 4–1 || –
|- align="center" bgcolor="#ddffdd"
| March 6 || Michigan || 11–3 || 5–1 || –
|- align="center" bgcolor="#ddffdd"
| March 12 ||  || 7–1 || 6–1 || –
|- align="center" bgcolor="#ffdddd"
| March 13 || Long Beach State || 0–2 || 6–2 || –
|- align="center" bgcolor="#ddffdd"
| March 13 || Long Beach State || 9–4 || 7–2 || –
|- align="center" bgcolor="#ddffdd"
| March 16 || at  || 15–2 || 8–2 || –
|- align="center" bgcolor="#ddffdd"
| March 19 ||  || 8–0 || 9–2 || –
|- align="center" bgcolor="#ddffdd"
| March 20 || Colorado State || 9–0 || 10–2 || –
|- align="center" bgcolor="#ddffdd"
| March 20 || Colorado State || 8–0 || 11–2 || –
|- align="center" bgcolor="#ddffdd"
| March 22 || Ohio State || 6–3 || 12–2 || –
|- align="center" bgcolor="#ddffdd"
| March 23 || Ohio State || 7–6 || 13–2 || –
|- align="center" bgcolor="#ddffdd"
| March 24 || Ohio State || 10–3 || 14–2 || –
|- align="center" bgcolor="#ddffdd"
| March 25 ||  || 10–3 || 15–2 || –
|- align="center" bgcolor="#ddffdd"
| March 26 || Oregon State || 9–3 || 16–2 || –
|- align="center" bgcolor="#ddffdd"
| March 27 || Oregon State || 9–4 || 17–2 || –
|- align="center" bgcolor="#ddffdd"
| March 27 || Oregon State || 2–0 || 18–2 || –
|- align="center" bgcolor="#ddffdd"
| March 29 ||  || 8–2 || 19–2 || –
|- align="center" bgcolor="#ddffdd"
| March 30 || Colorado || 16–3 || 20–2 || –
|-

|- align="center" bgcolor="#ddffdd"
| April 1 ||  || 10–2 || 21–2 || –
|- align="center" bgcolor="#ffdddd"
| April 2 || Oklahoma || 0–2 || 21–3 || –
|- align="center" bgcolor="#ddffdd"
| April 5 ||  || 7–1 || 22–3 || –
|- align="center" bgcolor="#ddffdd"
| April 6 || Utah State || 6–4 || 23–3 || –
|- align="center" bgcolor="#ddffdd"
| April 7 || Utah State || 9–4 || 24–3 || –
|- align="center" bgcolor="#ddffdd"
| April 9 ||  || 9–2 || 25–3 || 1–0
|- align="center" bgcolor="#ddffdd"
| April 10 || New Mexico || 20–3 || 26–3 || 2–0
|- align="center" bgcolor="#ddffdd"
| April 15 ||  || 6–0 || 27–3 || –
|- align="center" bgcolor="#ddffdd"
| April 16 || Wyoming || 8–0 || 28–3 || –
|- align="center" bgcolor="#ddffdd"
| April 17 || Wyoming || 10–3 || 29–3 || –
|- align="center" bgcolor="#ddffdd"
| April 17 || Wyoming || 7–0 || 30–3 || –
|- align="center" bgcolor="#ddffdd"
| April 19 ||  || 14–2 || 31–3 || –
|- align="center" bgcolor="#ddffdd"
| April 19 || New Mexico || 4–1 || 32–3 || 3–0
|- align="center" bgcolor="#ddffdd"
| April 20 || Sul Ross State || 8–2 || 33–3 || –
|- align="center" bgcolor="#ffdddd"
| April 23 || at  ||  3–12 || 33–4 || 3–1
|- align="center" bgcolor="#ffdddd"
| April 24 || at Arizona ||  1–4 || 33–5 || 3–2
|- align="center" bgcolor="#ddffdd"
| April 24 || at Arizona ||  10–4 || 34–5 || 4–2
|- align="center" bgcolor="#ddffdd"
| April 27 || at Grand Canyon || 6–1 || 35–5 || –
|- align="center" bgcolor="#ddffdd"
| April 30 || at New Mexico || 9–5 || 36–5 || 5–2
|-

|- align="center" bgcolor="#ffdddd"
| May 1 || at New Mexico || 11–12 || 36–6 || 5–3
|- align="center" bgcolor="#ddffdd"
| May 1 || at New Mexico || 3–2 || 37–6 || 6–3
|- align="center" bgcolor="#ffdddd"
| May 4 || Grand Canyon || 3–7 || 37–7 || –
|- align="center" bgcolor="#ddffdd"
| May 7 ||  || 7–6 || 38–7 || –
|- align="center" bgcolor="#ddffdd"
| May 8 || San Diego || 12–3 || 39–7 || –
|- align="center" bgcolor="#ddffdd"
| May 8 || San Diego || 18–3 || 40–7 || –
|- align="center" bgcolor="#ddffdd"
| May 14 || Arizona || 6–0 || 41–7 || 7–3
|- align="center" bgcolor="#ddffdd"
| May 15 || Arizona || 13–5 || 42–7 || 8–3
|- align="center" bgcolor="#ddffdd"
| May 15 || Arizona || 6–2 || 43–7 || 9–3
|-

|-
! style="background:#990033;color:white;"| Post-Season
|-

|- align="center" bgcolor="#ddffdd"
| May 28 || vs.  || 3–2 || 44–7
|- align="center" bgcolor="#ddffdd"
| May 29 || vs. Utah || 3–2 || 45–7
|- align="center" bgcolor="#ddffdd"
| May 29 || vs. Utah || 2–1 || 46–7
|-

|- align="center" bgcolor="ddffdd"
| June 3 || vs. Colorado State || 7–2 || 47–7
|- align="center" bgcolor="ddffdd"
| June 4 || vs. Colorado State || 12–3 || 48–7
|- align="center" bgcolor="ddffdd"
| June 4 || vs. Colorado State || 3–2 || 49–7
|-

|- align="center" bgcolor="ddffdd"
| June 7 || vs. Lafayette || Rosenblatt Stadium || 14–1 || 50–7
|- align="center" bgcolor="ddffdd"
| June 8 || vs.  || Rosenblatt Stadium || 13–3 || 51–7
|- align="center" bgcolor="ddffdd"
| June 9 || vs. Ohio State || Rosenblatt Stadium || 9–4 || 52–7
|- align="center" bgcolor="ddffdd"
| June 10 || vs. Saint Louis || Rosenblatt Stadium || 6–2 || 53–7
|- align="center" bgcolor="ffdddd"
| June 11 || vs. Ohio State || Rosenblatt Stadium || 3–7 || 53–8
|- align="center" bgcolor="ddffdd"
| June 12 || vs. Ohio State || Rosenblatt Stadium || 2–1 || 54–8
|-

Awards and honors 
Sal Bando
 College World Series Most Outstanding Player
 First Team All-WAC

Duffy Dyer
 First Team All-WAC

Luis Lagunas
 First Team All-American
 College World Series All-Tournament Team

Rick Monday
 The Sporting News Player of the Year
 First Team All-American
 First Team All-WAC
 College World Series All-Tournament Team

Doug Nurnberg
 College World Series All-Tournament Team

John Pavlik
 Second Team All-American
 First Team All-WAC

Sun Devils in the 1965 MLB Draft 
The following members of the Arizona State Sun Devils baseball program were drafted in the 1965 Major League Baseball Draft.

References 

Arizona State Sun Devils baseball seasons
College World Series seasons
NCAA Division I Baseball Championship seasons
Arizona State
Western Athletic Conference baseball champion seasons
1965 in sports in Arizona